Biu Chun Rangers, previously known as Rangers, will seek to win at least a trophy in this season. They are competing in the First Division League, Senior Challenge Shield and FA Cup this season.

Key events
 28 September 2012: Cameroonian midfielder Wilfred Bamnjo joins the club for free after being released by Tuen Mun this summer.
 4 November 2012: Head coach Goran Paulic was demoted to the youth team as youth team coach. Chan Hung Ping is named as their new head coach.
 10 January 2013: Biu Chun Rangers made a player exchange deal with South China. Wong Chin Hung joins Biu Chun Rangers from South China while Chak Ting Fung is transferred to South China. Both transfers are free transfers.
 23 January 2013: Brazilian defender Juninho joins the club from Sun Pegasus for an undisclosed fee.
 24 January 2013: Brazilian defender Luciano Silva da Silva joins the club from Vietnamese First Division side An Giang.
 31 January 2013: Hong Kong midfielder Yeung Chi Lun lefts the club and joins Sunray Cave JC Sun Hei for an undisclosed fee.

Players
As of 30 January 2013.

Remarks:
FP These players are registered as foreign players.

Players with dual nationality:
  Wilfred Bamnjo (Local player)
  Andy Nägelein (Local player, eligible to play for Hong Kong national football team)
  Liu Songwei (Local player, eligible to play for Hong Kong national football team)

Transfers

In

Stats

Squad Stats

Top scorers
As of 4 May 2013

Disciplinary record
As of 21 April 2013

Competitions

Overall

First Division League

Classification

Results summary

Results by round

Matches

Competitive

First Division League

Remarks:
1 Biu Chun Rangers's home matches against South China and Kitchee were played at Mong Kok Stadium instead of their usual home ground Sham Shui Po Sports Ground.
2 South China's home matches against Biu Chun Rangers were rescheduled and played at Mong Kok Stadium instead of their usual home ground of Hong Kong Stadium.

Senior Challenge Shield

First round

FA Cup

Quarter-finals

Notes

References

Hong Kong Rangers FC seasons
Hon